Putnam County is the least extensive county in the U.S. state of Illinois. According to the 2010 census, it had a population of 6,006. The county seat is Hennepin. The county was formed in 1825 out of Fulton County and named after Israel Putnam, who was a general in the American Revolution.
Putnam County is part of the Ottawa, IL Micropolitan Statistical Area.

Geography
It is the smallest county in Illinois by area.

Climate and weather

Major highways
  Interstate 180
  Illinois Route 18
  Illinois Route 26
  Illinois Route 29
  Illinois Route 71
  Illinois Route 89

Adjacent counties
 Bureau County (northwest)
 LaSalle County (east)
 Marshall County (south)

Demographics

As of the 2010 census, there were 6,006 people, 2,509 households, and 1,734 families residing in the county. The racial makeup of the county was 96.6% white, 0.5% black or African American, 0.2% Asian, 0.1% American Indian, 1.4% from other races, and 1.1% from two or more races. Those of Hispanic or Latino origin made up 4.2% of the population. In terms of ancestry, 46.5% were German, 16.7% were Irish, 16.3% were Italian, 10.9% were Polish, 10.1% were English, 5.1% were Swedish, and 3.5% were American.

Of the 2,509 households, 27.7% had children under the age of 18 living with them, 57.6% were married couples living together, 7.2% had a female householder with no husband present, 30.9% were non-families, and 26.0% of all households were made up of individuals. The average household size was 2.39 and the average family size was 2.85. The median age was 45.2 years.

The median income for a household in the county was $56,458 and the median income for a family was $68,875. Males had a median income of $50,205 versus $31,886 for females. The per capita income for the county was $27,004. About 6.2% of families and 10.9% of the population were below the poverty line, including 21.8% of those under age 18 and 5.4% of those age 65 or over.

Communities

Villages
 Granville
 Hennepin
 Magnolia
 Mark
 McNabb
 Standard

Unincorporated communities
 Florid
 Moronts
 Mount Palatine (partially in LaSalle)
 Putnam
 Walnut Grove

Townships
Putnam County is divided into four townships:
 Granville
 Hennepin
 Magnolia
 Senachwine

Politics

Prior to 1988, Putnam County was a Republican Party stronghold in presidential elections, backing the Republican candidate in all but three elections from 1892 to 1984. From 1988 to 2012, the county consistently backed Democratic Party presidential candidates, but none fared better than Illinois resident Barack Obama's 56.9% in 2008. However, he failed to win a majority of the county's votes four years later despite winning it overall in his 2012 reelection bid. This foreshadowed what was to come in the 2016 election, as the county swung 21.8 points Republican to back Donald Trump over Illinois-born Hillary Clinton by a margin of 19.9%.

See also
 National Register of Historic Places listings in Putnam County
 The 25th Annual Putnam County Spelling Bee

References

External links
 Putnam Information

 
Illinois counties
1825 establishments in Illinois
Ottawa, IL Micropolitan Statistical Area
Populated places established in 1825